Bobby Wilson (born October 6, 1981 in Oconomowoc, Wisconsin) is an American former racing driver.

An accomplished karter, Wilson won the "Stars of Tomorrow" championship and the Jim Trueman Scholarship in 2003 and was Shifter Kart Illustrated's driver of the year. He moved up to cars the following year and won the Formula Ford 2000 Zetec championship with four wins in his rookie season. In 2005 he made his Indy Pro Series debut with 3 starts for Brian Stewart Racing. In 2006, running for Michael Crawford and Kenn Hardley, he finished fourth in the Pro Series standings, capturing his first win from the pole at Watkins Glen International. For the 2007 season, he returned to Brian Stewart and won in Liberty Challenge Race 2 on the Indianapolis Motor Speedway road course. In 2008, he continued in the series, then known as the Firestone Indy Lights Series and for the new Team E outfit. He captured his first oval victory at the Milwaukee Mile on June 1.

The 2008 Indy Lights season was his last professional race appearance.

Racing record

SCCA National Championship Runoffs

References

External links
Official Website

1981 births
Indy Lights drivers
Living people
People from Oconomowoc, Wisconsin
Racing drivers from Wisconsin
Sportspeople from the Milwaukee metropolitan area
SCCA National Championship Runoffs participants
U.S. F2000 National Championship drivers

Panther Racing drivers